Sawadogo is a Burkinabé surname and may refer to:

Aboubacar Sawadogo (born 1989), Burkinabé international footballer
Adama Sawadogo (born 1990), Burkinabé international footballer
Bienvenu Sawadogo (born 1995), Burkinabé sprinter specialising in the 400 metres
Cilia Sawadogo (born 1965), Canadian-Burkinabé-German filmmaker
Clément Sawadogo, Burkinabé politician, Minister of the Civil Service, Labour and Social Security in Burkina Faso
Isaka Sawadogo (born 1966), Burkinabé actor
Mahama Sawadogo (1954–2017), Burkinabé politician, former President of the CDP Parliamentary Group in the National Assembly of Burkina Faso
Marie Blandine Sawadogo, member of the Pan-African Parliament from Burkina Faso
Salimata Sawadogo (born 1958), former chair of the African Commission on Human and Peoples' Rights
Siméon Sawadogo, Burkinabé politician
Souleymane Sawadogo (born 1995), Burkinabé professional football player
Tindwende Sawadogo (born 1995), Burkinabé Olympic swimmer
Yacouba Sawadogo, farmer from Burkina Faso who restores damaged soil using a traditional farming technique called Zaï

See also
Sławutówko
Zawadówka (disambiguation)

Surnames of Burkinabé origin
de:Sawadogo
fr:Sawadogo
it:Sawadogo